Manuel Velarde Seoane (12 June 1833 – 12 November 1900) was a Peruvian Army officer, who participated in the War of the Pacific. He was the senator for Cajamarca (1874-1878); Minister of Government (1881, 1883, 1886, 1893); President of the Council of Ministers (1883 and 1893); and Minister of War (1883 and 1899-1900).

References

1900 deaths
Peruvian Army officers
Members of the Senate of Peru
1833 births
19th-century politicians
20th-century Peruvian politicians
People from Lima
Government ministers of Peru